Pseudocatharylla subgioconda is a moth in the family Crambidae. It was described by Stanisław Błeszyński in 1964. It is found in Nigeria.

References

Crambinae
Moths described in 1964